Dipterocarpus hispidus is a species of tree in the family Dipterocarpaceae, endemic to Sri Lanka.

Flowers
Inflorescence - hardly branched raceme.

Uses
Wood - construction timber, plywood.

Culture
Known as බූ හොර (bu hora) in Sinhala.

References

 http://www.srilankaview.com/Flora/flora_srilanka209.htm
 
 http://www.mergili.at/worldimages/picture.php?/4018 
 http://www.theplantlist.org/tpl/record/kew-2772176
 https://books.google.com/books?id=EoEDLlXcdvYC&pg=PA201

hispidus
Endemic flora of Sri Lanka
Critically endangered flora of Asia